This list comprises Fijian citizens, and some foreigners associated with Fiji.  For the sake of size, persons who could be listed under multiple categories should generally be listed only under the category for which they are best known.

The term Fijian is used here in a national rather than an ethnic sense.

Academic leaders 
 Chandra, Rajesh, Vice-Chancellor of the University of Fiji
 Lal, Brij, historian
 Narayan, Paresh, Fiji-born Australian academic
 Pillay, Sarojini, Registrar of the University of Fiji
 Rudrananda, Swami, founder of the Then India Sanmarga Ikya Sangam
 Siwatibau, Savenaca, academic leader; Vice-Chancellor of the University of the South Pacific (1940–2003)

Activists 
 Ali, Shamima, political activist and women's rights campaigner
 Bhagwan-Rolls, Sharon, political activist and women's rights campaigner
 Heffernan, Angie, political activist
 Luveni, Jiko, dentist and AIDS campaigner; Speaker of the Parliament of Fiji since 2014
 Singh, Anirudh, opposed the imposition of the 1990 Constitution
 Siwatibau, Suliana, political activist

Business people 
 Iqbal, Imraz, political activist, businessman, former journalist
 Khan, Ballu, business tycoon
 Kumar, Lokeshani, business tycoon; hospitality owner/operator; originally from Lautoka, Fiji; currently residing in London, Ontario, Canada
 Munjal, C.K., businessman and entrepreneur, founder of the Munjal Charitable Trust
 Nagindas, Shivlal, Labasa businessman and former Senator
 Nawalowalo, Ratu Josateki, businessman and Chairman of the Kadavu Provincial Council
 Niranjan, Sangeeta, businesswoman
 Punja, Hari (born 1937), business tycoon
 Samisoni, Adi Mere, businesswoman and Member of Parliament
 Seeto, Dixon, business tycoon and president of the Chinese Association of Fiji
 Sharma, Sunil, partner at Aliz Pacific, one of the leading accounting firms in Fiji; Secretary/Treasurer of Suva Chamber of Commerce & Industry
 Singh, Rajnesh, businessman and technologist
 Singh, Ram, Indian-born businessman
Deo, Raten, businessman, owner of Shop N Save Supermarkets
 Toganivalu, Davila, businesswoman and newspaper publisher
 Waradi, Taito, President of the Fiji Chamber of Commerce and Industry

Chiefs 
Chiefs, excluding chiefs listed in other sections, include:

 Ratu Kuliniyasi Roko Malani, father of Ratu Wilisoni Tuiketei Malani, chief, elder lineage Gonesau of Vueti, 1st Roko Tui Bau, Tui Viti.
 Cakobau, Ratu Epenisa, Bauan chief
 Kanakana, Ratu Epeli, Fijian chief (Tui Suva)
 Katonivere, Ratu Aisea, Tui Macuata (paramount chief of Macuata)
 Kadavulevu, Ratu Penaia, Vunivalu of Bau (1901–1914)
 Madraiwiwi, Ratu Joni (the First), chief (1859–1920)
 Nailatikau, Ratu Epeli (the First) (1842–1901), Vunivalu of Bau
 Niumataiwalu, founder of the Vuanirewa dynasty in the Lau Islands
 Rasolo, first Tui Nayau
 Rokocegu, Maculeku, Tui Dreketi
 Rokomatu, Adi Joana, Tui Sigatoka
 Sovasova, Ratu Jovesa, Tui Vitogo (1942–2005)
 Tupou, Ratu Taliai, Tui Nayau (d. 1875)
 Tarau of Tovu Totoya, Fijian chieftainess
 Udre Udre, Ratu, 19th century cannibal
 Ulugalala, Alifereti Finau, Tui Nayau (d. 1934)
 Visawaqa, Ratu Tanoa, Vunivalu of Bau (1800s)
 Uluilakeba I, successor to Rasolo (q.v.) as Tui Nayau, but not so installed

Civil servants 
 Acraman, Rodney, former Ombudsman and Chairman of the Fiji Human Rights Commission
 Bainimarama, Meli, CEO of Fijian Affairs Board (December 2006-January 2007; subsequently reemployed as an advisor to the board)
 Browne, Joseph
 Hatch, Hector, former Chairman of the Public Service Commission
 Huggett, Stuart, former Chairman of the Public Service Commission
 Jale, Anare, Chief Executive Officer of the Public Service Commission; former Ambassador to the United States
 Korovavala, Lesi, Chief Executive Officer of the Home Affairs Ministry
 Kotobalavu, Joji, Chief Executive Officer of the Prime Minister's Department
 Naupoto, Viliame, former Navy Commander; former Director of Immigration from January 2007; now the current Minister for Youth and Sports
 Qionibaravi, Adi Litia, Chief Executive Officer of the Fijian Affairs Board
 Ram, Rishi, Chairman of the Public Service Commission and former Ambassador to Japan
 Ridgeway, Peter, former Deputy Director of Prosecutions
 Shameem, Shaista, Director of the Fiji Human Rights Commission
 Taoka, Aisea, Commissioner of Prisons
 Tuisolia, Ratu Sakiusa, former Chief Executive Officer of Airports Fiji Limited
 Vakalalabure, Ratu Rakuita, Deputy Speaker of the House, member of House of Representatives of Fiji
 Vakalalabure, Ratu Tevita, Senator, President of the Senate, member of the Great Council of Chiefs, member of House of Representatives, Vunivalu of Natewa

Entertainment and media 

 Derek Boyer, "The Island Warrior", actor
 Mike Howlett, musician
 Cassius Khan, classical tabla and ghazal player now based in Vancouver, British Columbia, Canada
 Talei Burns, vocalist, musician
 Malumu ni Tobu kei Naivaukura, musician
 Lagani Rabukawaqa, musician
 Rebecca Singh, television news presenter, now based in New Zealand
 DJ Ritendra, music producer
 Kula Kei Uluivuya, musician
 Laisa Vulakoro, singer
 Savuto Vakadewavosa, singer
 Elena Baravilala, singer

Diplomats 
 Bune, Poseci, diplomat and politician
 Konrote, George, diplomat and politician; Rotuman
 Nailatikau, Ratu Epeli, President of Fiji (since 2009) and former High Commissioner to the United Kingdom, Parliamentary Speaker, and Cabinet Minister
 Nandan, Satya, Secretary-General of the International Seabed Authority (1996–present)
 Savua, Isikia, diplomat and former Police Commissioner
 Tavola, Kaliopate, Minister for Foreign Affairs (2000–2006) and former Ambassador to Belgium
 Vitusagavulu, Jesoni, businessman and diplomat, Ambassador to Washington (2005)
 Waqanisau, Jeremaia, career soldier and diplomat; Ambassador to China

Legal 
 Fatiaki, Daniel, Chief Justice (2002–2007)
 Gates, Anthony, Chief Justice (since 2007)
 Kepa, Sailosi, judge, diplomat, cabinet minister, ombudsman (1938–2004)
 Matanitobua, Naomi, Chief Magistrate
 Mishra, Ghananand, jurist (1916–2005)
 Naqiolevu, Sekove, judge
 Shameem, Nazhat, judge
 Singh, Ajit Swaran, Fiji-born New Zealand judge
 Tuivaga, Sir Timoci, Chief Justice (1974–2002)

Military leaders 
 Bainimarama, Voreqe (Frank), military commander and interim Head of State (2000; 2006–2007); interim Prime Minister of Fiji (2007–2014), Prime Minister since 2014. Leader of the 2006 Fijian coup d'état.
 Baledrokadroka, Ratu Jone, Lieutenant Colonel and former Acting Land Force Commander
 Driti, Pita, Land Force Commander (as of early 2007)
 Kean, Francis, Navy Commander (as of early 2007)
 Leweni, Neumi, Army spokesman
 Mara, Ratu Tevita, Army Major; former Army Chief of Staff (as of 2006)
 Naupoto, Viliame, former Navy Commander; Director of Immigration (as of early 2007)
 Rabuka, Sitiveni, 1987 coup leader, later Prime Minister (1992–1999)
 Rabukawaqa, Orisi, Army spokesman
 Saubulinayau, Meli, senior Army officer
 Seruvakula, Viliame, Army officer, who led the counteroffensive against the mutiny at Queen Elizabeth Barracks on 2 November 2000
 Sukanaivalu, Sefanaia, war hero (Second World War)
 Teleni, Esala, Naval Captain and former Deputy Commander of the Republic of Fiji Military Forces
 Waqanisau, Jeremia, career soldier and diplomat; Ambassador to China
 Humphrey Tawake, Captain and Chief Naval Officer
 Semi Koroilavesau, rose to the rank of Commander, prior to running for elected office
 Netani Sukanaivalu, rose to the rank of Lieutenant Commander, prior to running for elected office

Police officers 
 Bulamainaivalu, Kevueli, Assistant Commissioner of Police - Crime
 Driver, Moses, Deputy Commissioner of Police
 Hughes, Andrew, Commissioner of Police
 Khan, Jahir, Senior Superintendent of Police
 Koroi, Jimi, Acting Commissioner of Police (2006–2007)
 Matakibau, Samuela, Assistant Police Commissioner Operations
 Ridgeway, Peter, former Deputy Director of Prosecutions
 Tikotikoca, Romanu, Commissioner of Police

Political leaders

Religious leaders 
 Arya, Kamlesh, President Arya Pratinidhi Sabha
 Bryce, Jabez, Anglican Bishop
 Chambers, Amy, Anglican priest
 Dudley, Hannah, Methodist missionary
 Kuppuswami, Sadhu, Hindu religious leader (1890–1956)
 Kurulo, Suliasi, head of the Fiji- based Christian Mission Fellowship
 Kush, Kundan Singh, Arya Samaj missionary
 Mataca, Petero, Roman Catholic Archbishop of Fiji
 Qiliho, Apimeleki, first indigenous Fijian Anglican Bishop
 Sharma, Gabriel, first Indo-Fijian Anglican Bishop
 Sharma, Shri Krishna, Arya Samaj (Hindu) religious leader
 Sing, Sakiusa, Roman Catholic priest and educator (1946–2005)
 Tariq, Imam Fazlullah, Ahmadiyya Muslim Jama'at Missionary In-charge
 Yabaki, Akuila, clergyman and human rights activist

Sportspeople

Unionists
 Anthony, Felix, FTUC General Secretary
 Chandra, Baba Ram, India-born trade unionist
 Muni, Vashist, labour union organizer
 Naivaluwaqa, Timoci, trade unionist (1953–2006)
 Prasad, Ayodhya, founder of Kisan Sangh
 Rae, Pramod, labour union organizer and National Federation Party Secretary
 Sami, Jagannath, labour union organizer; suspended in late 2006 as chief executive officer of the Sugar Cane Growers Council
 Sanadhya, Totaram, labour union organizer
 Singh, Attar, FITCU General Secretary
 Singh, Mehar, founder of the Vishal Sangh
 Singh, Nirbhay, CPSU official

Miscellaneous 
Fijian public figures who do not fit into one of the more other categories include:

 Navakasuasua, Maciu, 2000 coup plotter
 Padarath, Ben, 2006 election candidate, later imprisoned for manslaughter
 Waqabaca, Josaia, former NVTLP activist turned coup-plot informer

Non-resident Fiji Islanders 
Fiji Islanders who are living abroad, or who have been naturalised as citizens of other countries, or who were born abroad but have Fijian roots, include:

 Boyer, Derek, born in Lautoka, Fiji; acted in DOA: Dead or Alive released in 2006
 Butler, Trevor, winner of Big Brother Australia 2004
 Curuenavuli, Paulini, Australian-based singer and former member of the band Young Divas; born in Suva, Fiji
 Khan, Cassius, Canada, Indian classical musician; born in Lautoka
 Lal, Prerna, American writer and attorney; Fiji-born, Indian descent
 Mishra, Sudesh, Australian poet; Fiji-born, Indian descent
Narayan, Justin, winner of the thirteenth series of MasterChef Australia; born in Australia to Fiji-born parents of Indian origin
 Parker, Craig, New Zealand-based actor born in Suva, Fiji; acted in The Lord of the Rings: The Two Towers
 Satyanand, Anand, Governor-General of New Zealand; born in New Zealand to Fiji-born parents of Indian origin
 Singh, Bobby, Canadian football player; born in Suva
 Singh, Jason, Australian-born singer; Fiji Indian father

References

 Fijians